George Albert Stonestreet (1915-1993) was an Australian rugby league footballer who played in the 1930s and 1940s.

A prospect from the Newtown junior league, Stonestreet was graded in 1937 and rose through the ranks rapidly and had his first grade debut for Newtown on 19 June 1937. He retired at the end of the 1943 season.

Stonestreet died on 24 July 1993 at Umina, New South Wales.

References

1915 births
1993 deaths
Newtown Jets players
Australian rugby league players
Rugby league players from Sydney
Rugby league second-rows
Rugby league locks
Rugby league hookers